The ruisseau Contourné is a tributary of the north shore of the rivière aux Montagnais, flowing near the northern limit in the Laurentides Wildlife Reserve, in the province from Quebec, to Canada. The course crosses:
MRC Lac-Saint-Jean-Est Regional County Municipality, in administrative region of Saguenay–Lac-Saint-Jean, in the unorganized territory of Lac-Moncouche;
MRC La Côte-de-Beaupré Regional County Municipality, in administrative region of Capitale-Nationale, in the unorganized territory of Lac-Jacques-Cartier.

Forestry is the main economic activity in this valley; recreational tourism, second.

The surface of Contourné Creek (except the rapids areas) is usually frozen from the end of November to the beginning of April, however the safe circulation on the ice is generally done from mid-December to the end of March.

Geography 
The main watersheds adjacent to "Ruisseau Contourné" are:
 north side: Huard Lake, Métabetchouane River, Rivière aux Canots;
 east side: rivière aux Écorces, lac aux Écorces;
 south side: Métabetchouane River, Lac aux Montagnais, Métascouac Lake;
 west side: Métabetchouane River, Métabetchouane Lake.

The ruisseau Contourné rises at Lac Étoile. This misshapen lake has four bays; its mouth is located at the bottom of the south bay. The shape of these two lakes is similar.

  south, to the outlet (coming from the northeast) of Dépatie Lake;
  south, to the outlet (coming from the east) of lakes Louisette and Pinsonneault;
  southward to its mouth.

From the confluence of the Contourné stream, the current descends on:
  south, then northeast, the course of the rivière aux Montagnais;
  to the south, the course of the Moncouche River to its mouth;
  northerly the Métabetchouane River to the south shore of lac Saint-Jean;
  towards the north-east by crossing lac Saint-Jean;
  towards the east by taking the course of the Saguenay River via la Petite Décharge to Tadoussac where it merges with the Saint Lawrence estuary.

Toponymy 
The toponym "ruisseau Contourné" was formalized on December 5, 1968, at the Place Names Bank of the Commission de toponymie du Québec.

Notes and references

See also 

 Lac-Jacques-Cartier, an unorganized territory
 Lac-Saint-Jean-Est Regional County Municipality
 Lac-Moncouche, an unorganized territory
 La Côte-de-Beaupré Regional County Municipality
 Laurentides Wildlife Reserve
 Rivière aux Montagnais
 Moncouche River
 Métabetchouane River
 Lac Saint-Jean, a body of water
 Saguenay River
 St. Lawrence River
 List of rivers of Quebec

Rivers of Saguenay–Lac-Saint-Jean
Lac-Saint-Jean-Est Regional County Municipality
Rivers of Capitale-Nationale
La Côte-de-Beaupré Regional County Municipality
Laurentides Wildlife Reserve